The Cubatão River is a river of Paraná state in southern Brazil.

Origins

The Cubatão River originates in the municipality of São José dos Pinhais, where it is called the São João River.
The catchment area of the river is in the  Guaricana National Park, created in 2014.

Course

The São João forms part of the border between Sào José and Guaratuba. After it is joined by the Arraial it takes the name of Cubatão, flowing into the Guaratuba Bay.
Tributaries are the Castelhano, Coatís, Ribeirão Grande, Zoada, Navio Arraial, Cubatãozinho and Preto rivers.
The river is navigable up to Três Barras, and above there by canoe to the Salto do Rio Cubatão.
The Salto do Rio Cubatão is a series of rapids with large boulders, a tourist attraction.

See also
List of rivers of Paraná

References

Sources

Rivers of Paraná (state)